Nordheim High School or Nordheim School is a public high school located in Nordheim, Texas (USA) and classified as a 1A school by the UIL. It is part of the Nordheim Independent School District located in southwestern DeWitt County.   In 2015, the school was rated "Met Standard" by the Texas Education Agency.

Athletics
The Nordheim Pirates compete in these sports: Cross Country, Volleyball, Basketball, Golf, Tennis, Track, Baseball, and Softball

References

External links
 Nordheim ISD

 

Schools in DeWitt County, Texas
Public high schools in Texas